Sentot Prawirodirdjo (1807 – 17 April 1855), also known as Sentot Ali Pasha, was a Muslim military commander during the Java War.

Sentot was the son of Ronggo Prawirodirjo, who in turn was the brother-in-law of Sultan Hamengkubuwono IV. His father was considered a hero against the Dutch and was killed by the colonist Dutch under Herman Willem Daendels. With the death of his father, Sentot felt a grudge against the Dutch and eventually joined Prince Diponegoro in resisting them.

The title of "Ali Pasha" (allegedly meaning "high commander") was given to Sentot Prawirodirjo during his time studying military strategy in Turkey.

Sentot Prawirodirjo died at the age of 48 in Bengkulu, where he had been exiled by the Dutch government.

1807 births
1855 deaths
Indonesian exiles
Indonesian revolutionaries
Javanese people